Magrane District is a district of El Oued Province, Algeria. As of the 2008 census, it has a population of 36,812.

Communes

Magrane District consists of two communes:
Magrane
Sidi Aoun

References

Districts of El Oued Province